Jim or James Mead may refer to:

Politicians
James R. Mead (pioneer) (1836–1910), American pioneer and politician; co-founder of Wichita
James R. Mead (judge) (c.1861–1934), American jurist and politician from Connecticut
James M. Mead (1885–1964), American politician from New York

Performers
James Mead (actor) (1912–1985), American performer; later stage name James Craig
James Mead, American guitarist with 2001 Christian rock band Kutless

Others
James F. Mead, American scientist at UCLA in 1959; namesake of Mead acid
James Mead, American paleontologist (James M. Adovasio#Meadowcroft Rockshelter in 1970s)
Jim Mead, American aircraft designer (1983 Mitchell Wing P-38)
James Mead, American colonel with 1983 Multinational Force in Lebanon#Beirut IV
James Mead, American mixed martial artist; 2010 loss to Scott Cleve#Mixed martial arts record
Jim Mead, American TV director at Wisconsin's UWW TV#History in 2010s

Fictional characters
Jim Mead, support in 1922 American adventure According to Hoyle (film)
James Mead, villain in 1937 American film drama Big Town Girl

See also
James Meade (disambiguation)
Mead (surname)